Maurice Frederick Codner (27 September 1888 – 10 March 1958) was a British portrait painter. His portraits include those of Athene Seyler (1933), Evelyn Laye (1933), Sir George Robey (1935), Jean Batten (c.1935), Sir George Broadbridge (1937), Lord Alexander of Tunis (1946), Kathleen Ferrier (1946), King George VI (1951), Queen Elizabeth the Queen Mother (1952), Leslie Henson (1952), Gwilym Lloyd-George (1955) and Sir Albert Richardson (1956).

References 

1888 births
1958 deaths
British portrait painters